Schlag is a German surname. Notable people with the surname include:

Felix Schlag (1891–1974), United States currency designer
Pierre Schlag (born 1954), American legal writer

See also
 Schlag bei Thalberg, a municipality in the district of Hartberg in Styria, Austria

German-language surnames